The Siri Remote (known as the Apple TV Remote in regions where Siri is not supported) is a remote control released by Apple with the Siri-capable fourth generation and later Apple TV. The Siri Remote is the successor to the original Apple Remote.

Models

First generation 
The first generation Siri Remote is visually distinguished by a trackpad covering the upper third of its face. The multi-touch surface allows for clicking, swiping in either of four directions for navigation, and tilting the trackpad button in any direction to "tilt" buttons in the interface. The Siri Remote is equipped with dual microphones for spoken input for Siri and text entry. In addition to controlling the Apple TV itself, the Siri Remote can learn the IR codes to control the volume of a TV, sound bar, or receiver.

On September 12, 2017, along with the announcement of the Apple TV 4K, Apple announced an updated Siri Remote with a raised white border around the menu button and additional motion input for apps. Additionally, the price was reduced to $59.

Second generation 
On April 20, 2021 Apple announced a redesigned second generation Siri Remote in conjunction with an updated Apple TV 4K. The new remote is thicker with a curved back, changes the trackpad to a circular touch-enabled click pad reminiscent to the iPod click wheel, replaces the menu button with a back button, adds television power and mute buttons, and moves the Siri button to the upper right-side edge. The remote does not include an accelerometer and gyroscope, which were present in the previous Siri Remote, making it incompatible with some games. It is backwards compatible with previous tvOS-based Apple TVs and ships with an updated SKU of the Apple TV HD.

Third generation 
On October 18, 2022, Apple announced an updated third generation Siri Remote to ship with the Apple TV 4K (third generation) that includes a USB-C port for charging, replacing Lightning, and is otherwise identical to the second generation remote.

Specifications

Usability
The Siri Remote's usability has been controversial, with users reporting difficulty navigating using the trackpad. In late 2019, the Swiss telecom provider Salt, which uses the Apple TV 4K as the set-top box for its IPTV offerings, introduced its own replacement IR remote control using traditional buttons. It is sold as an optional accessory for about CHF 20.

See also
 Apple Remote
 Apple TV
 Front Row
 iTunes Remote
 Remote control

References

External links
  – official website

Apple Inc. hardware
Products introduced in 2015